Pipe Major Donald MacLeod  (14 August 1916 – 29 June 1982) was a Scottish bagpiper, British Army Pipe major, composer and bagpipe instructor.

Life 
Donald MacLeod ("Wee Donald") was born in Stornoway on the Isle of Lewis on 14 August 1916. Macleod was mentored and tutored by John Morrison, who took him to his first Northern Meeting. He was also tutored by Willie Ross, and every week for 27 years by John MacDonald of Inverness.

He joined the British Army in 1937, and went to France in 1940 with the 2nd Battalion of the Seaforth Highlanders in the British Expeditionary Force. Captured as a prisoner of war during the surrender at St. Valery-en-Caux, he escaped during the march to Germany and returned to France in 1944 as pipe major of the 7th Battalion of the Seaforth Highlanders.

After the war, he competed in solo competitions, and won the Gold Medal at the Northern Meeting in Inverness in 1947 and at the Argyllshire Gathering in Oban in 1954. 

After leaving the British Army in 1963, MacLeod became a partner in Grainger and Campbell, a Glasgow bagpipe-manufacturing firm.

He was made Member of the Most Excellent Order of the British Empire (MBE) in 1978. With his wife Winnie he had two daughters, Susan and Fiona.

Musical influence
MacLeod tutored several top players, including John Wilson, Iain MacDonald, and P/M Iain M Morrison. He regularly taught at summer schools in North America.

MacLeod's tutorial on pibroch contains 220 recordings in 21 volumes.

The P/M Donald MacLeod MBE Memorial Competition, instituted by Iain M Morrison, is an invitational piping competition held in his memory on the Isle of Lewis since 1994.

Discography
 A Puckle Pipers
Positively Piobaireachd
Piper in the Nave

Compositions
He published six volumes of light music and one of pibroch, and after his death Iain Macdonald compiled a further volume. 

Among his light music compositions were tunes such as:

 Susan MacLeod
 Fiona MacLeod
 Glasgow City Police Pipers
 Crossing the Minch
 The Blackberry Bush

Some piobaireachd compositions tunes include:
 Cabar Feidh Gu Brath
 Queen Elizabeth the Second's Salute
 The Field of Gold
 Lament for the Iolaire

References

People from Stornoway
Great Highland bagpipe players
1916 births
1982 deaths
Gold Medal winners (bagpipes)
Members of the Order of the British Empire
British Army personnel of World War II
Seaforth Highlanders officers
British World War II prisoners of war
World War II prisoners of war held by Germany
Scottish escapees
Scottish bagpipe players
Escapees from German detention